is a Japanese football player for Giravanz Kitakyushu.

Career
After attending Nissho Gakuen High School, Nakayama joined Giravanz Kitakyushu in December 2017.

Club statistics
Updated to 29 August 2018.

References

External links

Profile at J. League
Profile at Giravanz Kitakyushu

1999 births
Living people
Association football people from Miyazaki Prefecture
Japanese footballers
J2 League players
J3 League players
Giravanz Kitakyushu players
Association football forwards